Karl Skifjeld (11 April 1920 – 3 December 1996) was a Norwegian footballer. He played in six matches for the Norway national football team from 1949 to 1951.

References

External links
 

1920 births
1966 deaths
Norwegian footballers
Norway international footballers
Place of birth missing
Association footballers not categorized by position